Park Ye-eun (born May 26, 1989), professionally known as Yeeun, Yenny, or Ha:tfelt, is a South Korean singer, songwriter and composer known for her work as a former member of South Korean girl group Wonder Girls. In July 2014, she made her debut as solo artist under the name Ha:tfelt with released her solo EP Me?. In early 2017, Wonder Girls officially disbanded due to contract expiration. Following the disbandment, Yeeun signed with Amoeba Culture to continue her career as solo artist.

Career

2007–2013: Career beginnings 

In January 2007, Park was revealed as the fifth member of Wonder Girls. The group officially debuted on MBC's Show! Music Core on February 10, 2007. She composed the songs "Saying I Love You" and "For Wonderful", and performed them live in one of Wonder Girls' US concerts. She also composed "G.N.O (Girl's Night Out)" from their sophomore album and Wonder World.

In 2012, Park wrote a song for the Korean drama series Dream High 2, which was released on February 14, 2012. She later made a cameo appearance on the drama to perform the song.

2014–present: Solo debut 
On July 31, 2014, Park made her debut as solo artist under the pseudonym HA:TFELT (an amalgamation of the words "hot" and "heartfelt;" the British pronunciation of “heartfelt") with her debut EP Me?. The album was included in Billboard'''s list of the 10 best K-pop albums of 2014.

On January 26, 2017, it was announced that Wonder Girls were to disband after unsuccessful contract renewal negotiations with some of its members, including Yeeun herself, who parted ways with JYP Entertainment. The group released their final single "Draw Me", co-written by Yeeun, on February 10. The song also served as a celebration of the group's 10th anniversary since debut.

In April 2017, Park signed with Amoeba Culture, becoming the label's first female solo artist in eleven years.

She subsequently released two soundtrack singles for the Korean travel series Cross Country: "Thru The Sky" and "Cross Country," a collaboration track with Kim Bo-hyung and Suran. In May, Yeeun was credited as a songwriter on "Only You" from former labelmate Twice's EP Signal.

On October 12, 2017, Park released her first single, Meine ("mine" in German), consisting of two songs: "I Wander" featuring Dynamic Duo's Gaeko and "Read Me" featuring PUNCHNELLO.

On April 18, 2018, her second single album, Deine ("yours" in German), was released. The single consists of two songs: "Pluhmm" and "Cigar".

On August 1, 2019, Park's single "Happy Now" was released, featuring Moonbyul of Mamamoo.

On April 23, 2020, Park released her first full-length album, 1719, along with music videos for the three leading singles ("Life Sucks," "Sweet Sensation," and "Satellite").

On July 14, 2021, Park released her new digital single "Summertime", featuring Keem Hyo-eun.

On April 19, 2022, Park released her new single album Left'', consisting of four songs.

In November 2022, Park was announced, will hold a solo concert ORANGE Friday' at Shinhan pLay Square Live Hall in Seoul on the 18th.

Discography

Studio albums

Extended plays

Single albums

Singles

Composition Credits

Source: Korea Music Copyright Association and Melon

Filmography

Film

Television

Variety shows

Musical theatre

Awards and nominations

Notes

References

External links 
 

1989 births
Living people
Wonder Girls members
English-language singers from South Korea
Japanese-language singers of South Korea
Mandarin-language singers of South Korea
JYP Entertainment artists
Korean Music Award winners
South Korean female idols
South Korean female models
South Korean women pop singers
South Korean television actresses
South Korean television personalities
People from Goyang